Balqoli-ye Kohneh (also Romanized as Balqolī-ye Kohneh; also known as Bolāgholī-ye Kohneh and Bolāghlī Kohneh) is a village in Golestan Rural District, in the Central District of Jajrom County, North Khorasan Province, Iran. At the 2006 census, its population was 6, in 4 families.

References 

Populated places in Jajrom County